Alice Adams is a 1921 novel by Booth Tarkington that received the 1922 Pulitzer Prize for the Novel. It was adapted as a film in 1923 by Rowland V. Lee and more famously in 1935 by George Stevens. The narrative centers on the character of a young woman (the eponymous Alice Adams) who aspires to climb the social ladder and win the affections of a wealthy young man named Arthur Russell. The story is set in a lower-middle-class household in an unnamed town in the Midwest shortly after World War I.

Plot
The novel begins with Virgil Adams confined to bed with an unnamed illness. There is tension between Virgil and his wife over how he should go about recovering, and she pressures him not to return to work for J.A. Lamb once he is well. Alice, their daughter, attempts to keep peace in the family, with mixed results, and she walks to her friend Mildred Palmer's house to see what Mildred will wear to a dance that evening.

After Alice's return, she spends the day preparing for the dance and goes to pick violets for a bouquet because she cannot afford to buy flowers for herself. Her brother Walter initially refuses to accompany her to the dance, but because Alice cannot go without an escort, Mrs. Adams prevails upon Walter into renting a Tin Lizzie to drive Alice to the dance.

Walter's attitude towards the upper class is one of obvious disdain. He would rather spend his time gambling with the African-American servants in the cloakroom than be in the ballroom at the dance. Alice forces him to dance with her at first because it will be a grave embarrassment for her to stand alone, but Walter eventually abandons her. Alice tries to give the impression that she is not standing by herself, and she then dances with Frank Dowling, whose attentions she does not welcome, and Arthur Russell, a rich newcomer to town who is rumored to be engaged to Mildred and whom she believes to have danced with her out of pity and at Mildred's request. She leaves the dance and is horribly embarrassed after Arthur discovers Walter gambling with the servants.

The next day, Alice goes into town on an errand for her father and passes Frincke's Business College on the way with a shudder since she sees it as a place that drags promising young ladies down to "hideous obscurity." On the walk back home, she encounters Arthur Russell, who shows an obvious interest in her. As she assumes that he is all but spoken for, she does not know how to handle the conversation. She warns him not to believe the things girls like Mildred will say about her, and she tells a number of lies to obscure her family's humble economic status.

Arthur returns several days later, and his courtship of Alice continues. All seems well between them until he mentions a dance being thrown by the young Miss Henrietta Lamb. Arthur wants to escort Alice to the dance, and she lies to cover up that she was not invited. Mrs. Adams uses Alice's distress to finally goad Virgil into setting up a glue factory, which she has long insisted would be the family's ticket to success. It is eventually revealed that the glue recipe was developed by Virgil and another man under the direction and in the employ of J.A. Lamb, who, over the years, declined to take up its production despite repeated prodding from Virgil. Although he is initially reluctant to "steal" from Mr. Lamb, Virgil finally persuades himself that his improvements to the recipe over the years has made it his.

As Arthur continues his secret courtship of Alice (he never talks about her or tells anyone where he spends his evenings), Alice continues spinning a web of lies to preserve the image of herself and her family that she has invented. That becomes especially difficult when she and Arthur encounter Walter in a bad part of town when he is walking with a young woman, who gives the appearance of being a prostitute. At home, Walter is confronted by his father, who demands Walter to quit Lamb's to help in setting up the glue factory. Walter refuses to help his father without a $300 cash advance, which Virgil cannot afford.

Virgil arranges to resign from Lamb's employ without speaking to him face to face because he fears the old man's reaction, and he puts the glue factory into operation. Meanwhile, Alice works frantically to convince Arthur that the things other people will say about her are not true, and she continues to press the point even when Arthur insists that no one has spoken about her behind her back and that nothing anyone else could say would change his opinion of her. Mrs. Adams decides to arrange a dinner so that Arthur can meet the family and sets about planning an elaborate meal and hiring servants for the day so that Arthur will be impressed.

Walter again demands cash from his father (the amount has now risen to $350) without explaining why he needs it, and he again is rebuffed. While the events occur at the Adams house, Arthur finally overhears things about Alice that strikes a chord, and her family, including the fact that Virgil Adams has "stolen" from J.A. Lamb in setting up a factory with Lamb's secret recipe for glue.

The dinner is a total disaster since the day is unbearably hot, the food is far too heavy, and the hired servants are surly and difficult to manage. That is capped by Virgil's unwittingly acting like his lower-middle-class self, not the well-to-do businessman that his wife and daughter wish him to act like. Arthur, still reeling from what he heard about the Adamses earlier in the day, is stiff and uneasy throughout the evening, and Alice feels increasingly uncomfortable. By the end of the night, it is apparent to her that he will not come courting again, and she bids him farewell. That night, word reaches the family that Walter has skipped town and leaves behind him a massive debt to J.A. Lamb, which will have to be paid to keep Walter out of jail.

The following morning, Virgil arrives at work to see that Lamb is opening his own glue factory on such a huge scale that Adams will not be able to compete, and he never will make enough money to either pay his son's debts or pay off the family's mortgage.

Virgil confronts Lamb about the situation, works himself into such a state that he collapses, and returns to the same sickbed where he was at the beginning of the book. Lamb takes pity on the man and arranges to buy the Adams glue factory for a price sufficient to pay off Walter's debts and the family's mortgage. The Adams family takes in boarders to help keep the family afloat economically, and Alice heads downtown to Frincke's Business College to train herself in employable skills so that she can support the family. She encounters Arthur on the road and is pleased that their conversation is both polite and brief. She calmly accepts that there is no possibility of renewing the romance between them.

Main characters
 Alice Adams – The protagonist. An ambitious and vivacious young woman of 22 years whose optimism belies her lower social status, and who uses a pattern of lies and misleading signals to obscure her family's true status.
 Arthur Russell – An upper-class young man smitten with Alice, who is not entirely aware of the Adams family's status in town.
 Virgil Adams – Alice's father. A man of integrity who lacks ambition. He feels pressured to violate his loyalty to his employer by his wife's insistence on providing for their children.
 Mrs. Adams – Alice's mother. A woman who always wants more than her husband provides, who is blind to her children's faults, and is the primary goad to her husband's ill-fated venture.
 Walter Adams – Alice's brother. A young man who prefers to consort with the lower classes (particularly African-Americans), and whose prodigal ways create trouble for him.
 J.A. Lamb – Virgil's boss. A generally honorable old man who runs a very successful business, and Virgil and Walter's employer.

Adaptations

The plot of the 1935 film (a remake of the silent movie based on the novel, which was filmed in 1923) revolves around a social-climbing girl (Katharine Hepburn) and her mother (Ann Shoemaker); it has minor changes from the novel and a different ending. It was written by Dorothy Yost, Mortimer Offner and Jane Murfin. The film was directed by George Stevens.

The movie was nominated for the Academy Award for Best Picture .

References

External links
 
 
 
 Photos of the first edition of Alice Adams
1950 Theatre Guild on the Air radio adaptation at Internet Archive

1921 American novels
Pulitzer Prize for the Novel-winning works
American novels adapted into films
Novels by Booth Tarkington
English-language books